Bamunakotuwa Divisional Secretariat is a  Divisional Secretariat  of Kurunegala District, of North Western Province, Sri Lanka.

References
 Divisional Secretariats Portal

Divisional Secretariats of Kurunegala District